Susan Bank (née Sweetster; born 1938) is an American photographer, and painter. 

As a documentary photographer, she is known for photos she took on regular trips to Cuba. Born in Portsmouth, New Hampshire, she did not take up photography until the age of 60. She studied photography under Mary Ellen Mark and Constantine Manos.

Collections
Her work is included in the collection of the Museum of Fine Arts, Houston, the Lehigh University Art Galleries Permanent Collection and the James A. Michener Museum of Art.

Bibliography
Cuba: Campo Adentro. Sagamore Press, 2008 
Piercing the Darkness. La Fabrica, 2012

References

Living people
1938 births
20th-century American photographers
21st-century American photographers
20th-century American women artists
21st-century American women artists